The Senate Finance Subcommittee on International Trade, Customs, and Global Competitiveness is one of the six subcommittees within the Senate Committee on Finance.

Members, 118th Congress

External links
Committee on Finance, Subcommittee page

References

Finance International Trade and Global Competitiveness